The 2016 Houston Cougars football team represented the University of Houston in the 2016 NCAA Division I FBS football season.  It was the 69th year of season play for Houston. They were led by head coach Tom Herman during the regular season and played their home games at TDECU Stadium in Houston. The Houston Cougars football team is a member of the American Athletic Conference in its West Division. They finished the season 9–4, 5–3 in American Athletic play to finish in a tie for third place in the West Division. They were invited to the Las Vegas Bowl where they lost to San Diego State.

On November 26, head coach Tom Herman resigned to become the head coach at Texas. He finished at Houston with a two-year record of 22–4. Houston was led by new head coach Major Applewhite in the Las Vegas Bowl.

Previous season and offseason

In the 2015 season, the Houston Cougars finished 13–1, one of the greatest seasons in school history. The Cougars beat #20 Temple in the AAC Championship game and advanced to beat #9 Florida State 38–24 in the Peach Bowl, one of the New Year's Six bowls.  The Cougars were ranked #8 in the final AP poll, which was their first final top-ten ranking since 1990, and their highest final ranking since the 1979 season.

Departures

Coaching departures
After serving as wide receivers coach and recruiting coordinator at Houston for one year, Drew Mehringer was named as offensive coordinator and quarterbacks coach for Rutgers on December 14, 2015.

Incoming transfers

2016 recruiting class

Walk-on recruits

National signing day was on Wednesday, February 3, 2016.

Returning starters

Offense

Defense

Special teams

Spring practice
The Houston Cougars football team held its annual Red and White Spring Game on Saturday, April 16, 2016, at TDECU Stadium.  The defense (White) defeated the offense (Red) 74–72.

Fall camp

Personnel

Roster

Coaching staff

Depth chart
The list of starters is to be announced.

Schedule
Houston played UCF, UConn, Tulane and Tulsa at home and Cincinnati, Memphis, Navy and SMU on the road.  The conference schedule was released February 9.

Schedule Source:

Game summaries

vs. Oklahoma

Lamar

at Cincinnati

at Texas State

UConn

at Navy

Tulsa

at SMU

UCF

Tulane

Louisville

at Memphis

vs. San Diego State (Las Vegas Bowl)

Rankings

References

Houston
Houston Cougars football seasons
Houston Cougars football